Central Office for South Vietnam (abbreviated COSVN), officially known as the Central Executive Committee of the People's Revolutionary Party from 1962 until its dissolution in 1976, was the American term for the North Vietnamese political and military headquarters inside South Vietnam during the Vietnam War. It was envisaged as being in overall command of the communist effort in the southern half of the Republic of Vietnam (South Vietnam), which included the efforts of both People's Army of Vietnam (PAVN), the Viet Cong, and the People's Revolutionary Party. Some doubted its existence but in his memoirs the American commander in South Vietnam, General William Westmoreland, spoke of it as something whose existence and importance were not in doubt.

According to PAVN Major General and later dissident Trần Độ, COSVN did, in fact exist and was responsible for organising and directing the Viet Cong  and served as overall command. It was however hierarchically directed by the Central Office (Trung ương Cục) which directed overall strategy, and was directly controlled by Hanoi. COSVN existed to operate the Viet Cong military and political effort.

MACV had imagined COSVN as a physically large, permanent structure due to their ability to carefully coordinate and direct Viet Cong activity entirely. It had become a near obsessive fixture for US and South Vietnamese leadership, given that it coordinated the complete activities of the Viet Cong. In fact these two organizations were composed of individuals living in thatched huts in the jungle just like all the guerrillas, and so there was no physical structure of any kind and existed as a highly-mobile headquarter to direct the Viet Cong war effort. The apparatus of the CO and COSVN had to move around all the time in order to avoid bombing and search and destroy operations conducted by the Americans, and was both physically capable of defending itself and highly mobile to continue to the nature of the war. Therefore, it can be stated that the CO and COSVN never had any kind of physical form.

US and South Vietnamese intelligence services had continually targeted COSVN for nearly a decade, given their near total importance in controlling the war effort. It had become an obsession of Richard Nixon in his view to win the war.

The Joint Chiefs of Staff claimed to have located the enemy's headquarters inside Cambodia — what the United States called the Central Office for South Vietnam, or COSVN. The chiefs envisioned it as a "Bamboo Pentagon," concealed beneath the jungle's canopy. They thought that if you could blow up this central headquarters, you could cripple the enemy's capacity to command and control attacks on US forces in South Vietnam. McCain said the United States should destroy it and win the damn war.

In 1965, nearly 400 US warplanes attempted to wipe out COSVN in an aerial attack, but had no effect on the elusive shadow command. Near-daily B-52 raids against its headquarters in Memot, Cambodia failed to kill any of its leadership and insertion of US / RVN Special Forces teams usually wound up dead or returning with heavy casualties, and it was described as "poking a beehive the size of a basketball". COSVN and CO continued to exist, evolving into the Provisional Revolutionary Government of the Republic of South Vietnam in 1969, and narrowly avoided capture of its entire headquarters by ARVN and Cambodian forces during the escape of the Provisional Revolutionary Government but still maintained its direct activities as serving as a Hanoi intermediary.

History
The headquarters was reportedly created in 1961 when the southern and central branches of the Lao Dong Party (the Vietnamese Communist Party) merged into the Central Directorate for the South. An advance element of the Party's Central Committee, the headquarters was chartered to direct VC guerrilla operations in South Vietnam. Major General Tran Luong came south in May 1961 to reorganize the structure of the Directorate and its subordinate regions, Military Regions 1, 2, 3, 4, 6 and 10, known collectively as the B-2 Front. In the process, he created COSVN.

In October 1963, COSVN organized the Military Affairs Party Committee (MAPC) and the Regional Military Headquarters. COSVN's first secretary, Nguyễn Văn Linh, served concurrently as the secretary of the MAPC, while General Trần Văn Trà became commander of the Regional Military Headquarters. Senior General Nguyễn Chí Thanh, a member of the northern politburo, arrived at COSVN in late 1963 or early 1964 to serve as southern regional political officer and became the dominant figure at the headquarters until his death during a visit to Hanoi in July 1967. This regional command structure reported through Thanh to the PAVN general staff in Hanoi. When Phạm Hùng replaced Thanh as the politburo's representative, he also became the first secretary of both COSVN and the MAPC.

Reputed locations
During the early 1960s, COSVN was located South Vietnam's Tây Ninh Province, northwest of Saigon near the Cambodian border. During the period  1965–1970, the headquarters was in and around the Cambodian Mimot plantation, in what was called the "Fishhook" area on the Vietnamese/Cambodian border north of Tây Ninh and west of Lộc Ninh. During the Cambodian Campaign of 1970, COSVN moved westward to the area around Kratié.

This was confirmed by first-person testimony provided to staff from the Cambodia-based media production group Camerado in 2008, during research for the motion picture Freedom Deal, which dramatizes the 1970 Cambodian Incursion from the point of view of the Cambodian people. A Cambodian community in the vicinity of Phnom Sambok, North of Kratié town, confirmed the location of staging areas for "large numbers of North Vietnamese vehicles and numerous structures" in the nearby forest.

A Time magazine article in 1970 reported that rather than being a jungle Pentagon as often conceived, "COSVN is actually a staff of some 2,400 people who are widely dispersed and highly mobile", traveling between various bunkers and meeting places by bicycle and motorbike.

Subdivisions
It was believed by US intelligence that COSVN had several subdivisions, each of which dealt with the political, logistical, and military aspects of the struggle in South Vietnam. For tactical reasons US Radio Research units were primarily concerned with the military divisions, which were known as "MAS-COSVN" (Military Affairs Section) and "MIS-COSVN" (Military Intelligence Section). The political and logistical sub-divisions were left to the 175th Radio Research Field Station at Bien Hoa. These two sub-divisions usually occupied a location removed from, but generally near, the headquarters itself, as determined by ARDF or airborne radio direction finding.

Operations to destroy COSVN

One of the central frustrations of the US military during the conflict was the Democratic Republic of Vietnam's (North Vietnam) use of Laos and Cambodia as logistical conduits and base areas. During the administration of President Lyndon B. Johnson, the US military was generally not allowed by its civilian commanders to widen the war by attacking the supply routes and sanctuaries in both countries due to their ostensible neutrality. An attempt was made to capture or destroy the headquarters during Operation Junction City, a massive search and destroy operation launched in the border region in February and March 1967.

Hampering bombing runs against rebel bases like COSVN was the assistance provided by Soviet ships in the Pacific. Soviet ships in the South China Sea gave vital early warnings to NLF forces in South Vietnam. The Soviet intelligence ships detected American B-52 bombers flying from Okinawa and Guam, and relayed their airspeed and direction to COSVN headquarters. COSVN used this data to determine probable targets, and directed assets along the flight path to move "perpendicularly to the attack trajectory". While the bombing runs still caused extensive damage, the early warnings from 1968 to 1970 prevented them from killing a single military or civilian leader in the headquarters complexes.

On January 4, 1968, some of COSVN officials from Tây Ninh province encountered American soldiers when they were attempting to transfer food in the jungle, Huỳnh Tấn Phát's daughter Huỳnh Lan Khanh was captured and started to be escorted to Saigon.  During the conflict several American military aircraft were shot down. Later Khanh's body was found by Viet Cong soldiers.  She was buried with two other Viet Cong soldiers who died in this conflict.

Later, President Richard Nixon authorized border reconnaissance attacks, first in 1969 in the form of the covert bombing campaign known as Operation Menu, wherein the suspected site of COSVN in Cambodia was repeatedly and heavily bombed. In the spring of 1970, an overt ground incursion took place—-first an ARVN attack and then a joint ARVN–American attack that would later be called the Cambodian Campaign.

On March 18, the Cambodian National Assembly officially deposed the Cambodian leader Norodom Sihanouk and named Lon Nol as provisional head of state. The North Vietnamese response to the coup was swift. Even before Lon Nol's March 12 ultimatum for PAVN and NFL forces to leave Cambodia, they had begun expanding their logistical system (the Ho Chi Minh trail) from southeastern Laos into northeastern Cambodia. After Sihanouk's overthrow and Lon Nol's anti-Vietnamese movements, PAVN launched an offensive (Campaign X) against the Cambodian army. They quickly seized large portions of the eastern and northeastern parts of the country, isolating and besieging or overrunning a number of Cambodian cities, including Kampong Cham. Fearing a joint ARVN–Cambodian attack after the coup, COSVN was evacuated to the newly Vietnamese-controlled Kratié Province of Cambodia on March 19, 1970.

As the PRG and NLF headquarters prepared to follow the COSVN into Cambodia on March 30, they were surrounded in their bunkers by South Vietnamese forces flown in by helicopter. Surrounded, they awaited till nightfall and then with security provided by the 7th they broke out of the encirclement and fled north to unite with the COSVN in the Cambodian Kratié province. Trương Như Tảng, then Minister of Justice in the PRG, recounts the march to the northern bases as day after day of forced marches in the rain. Just before the column crossed route 7 heading north, they received word that on April 3 the 9th Division had fought and won in a battle near the city of Krek, Cambodia against ARVN forces. Years later, Trương would recall that during the escape of the Provisional Revolutionary Government just how "close [South Vietnamese] were to annihilating or capturing the core of the Southern resistance - elite units of our frontline fighters along with the civilian and much of the military leadership.

A month later, at the end of April, the US and Army of the Republic of Vietnam (ARVN) tried again. The initial ARVN attack of the Cambodian Campaign was launched by ARVN and US ground forces, which attempted to "clean out the sanctuaries". PAVN/NLF forces, however, had already been evacuated on March 19. COSVN and its sub-divisions had already withdrawn to the Kratié area and successfully avoided destruction. A marked reduction in radio traffic and transmitter power also made them difficult to place accurately at their new location, despite close 24-hour monitoring.

The military benefits and tragic repercussions of the bombing and invasion have been contentious subjects. Westmoreland thought that it was "unfortunate" that Nixon had announced the capture of COSVN as one of the primary objectives of the Cambodian operations. This left Nixon open to critics, who were already scornful of Nixon, to mock the notion of the president obsessing over COSVN as if it were a "holy grail". US Secretary of State Henry Kissinger was quoted as saying that the Cambodian invasion to destroy COSVN and other headquarters complexes bought the Americans and South Vietnamese a year. Members of the COSVN generally agree, but view the long-term political advantage gained as being worth the cost of the evacuation.

"Bamboo Pentagon"
The "Bamboo Pentagon" was a mythical military headquarters of the Viet Cong, believed by US President Richard Nixon and the Joint Chiefs of Staff to exist deep inside the jungles of Cambodia. A further belief that destroying it would bring about an end to the Vietnam War helped lead to the American Invasion of Cambodia on April 29, 1970.

Bibliography
Notes

References
  - Total pages: 156 
 - Total pages: 350 
 
 - Total pages: 446 

Base areas of the Viet Cong
Vietnam War